Shah Firuz (also Romanized as Shāh Fīrūz or Shah Firooz) is a village in Shabankareh Rural District, Shabankareh District, Dashtestan County, Bushehr Province, Iran. At the 2006 census, its population was 254, in 48 families.

References 

Populated places in Dashtestan County